The Spanish Wheelchair Basketball League, in Spanish called División de Honor de Baloncesto en Silla de Ruedas is the top-flight professional league for wheelchair basketball teams in Spain with men and women players. It is governed by the Spanish Sports Federation for People with Physical Disabilities (FEDDF).

Founded in 1971 as Primera División it changed its name to División de Honor in 1992.

Competition format
Ten teams compete annually in the league, played with a double round-robin format. The Spanish league the only one of the major leagues in Europe without playoffs.

The last two teams are relegated to a lower league, the Spanish Wheelchair Basketball First División while the two top ranked teams of the lower league are promoted to the División de Honor. CD Ilunion, formerly called CD Fundosa ONCE is the most successful team.

2016–17 teams

Latest winners
Despite the league was created in 1971, there are only reliable sources of results and league tables since 1989, when it started to be sponsored by ONCE.

See also
Wheelchair basketball
IWBF Champions Cup
André Vergauwen Cup
Willi Brinkmann Cup
IWBF Challenge Cup

References

External links

Unofficial website

Wheelchair
Wheelchair basketball leagues in Europe
1971 establishments in Spain
Sports leagues established in 1971